Folio Corporation was founded in 1987 to publish books on CD-ROMs.

History 
The first product, NFolio 1.2, was shipped in September 1988 as part of Novell NetWare. Users typing "help" at any DOS prompt on a Novell network were presented with the online NetWare manuals in Folio Infobase format. Over the years, Folio continued to spread as part of Novell's NetWare, to an estimated 25 million desktops.

NFolio allowed users to view information received from multiple sources, add personal notes to that information, and create a personal "infobase" (information database) that could be shared and easily used by others. NFolio also allowed fast indexing using a feature that automatically indexed every word in an infobase. With the release of version 2 of NFolio in March 1989, NFolio was renamed to Folio Views 1.0.

In March 1990, Folio released Folio Views 1.3 with a new feature named Folio Legal Views that allowed creation and indexing of legal dispositions and other legal documents, using what was called DepoPrep.

In July 1990, Folio released Folio Views 2.0 with 100 new features, including new types of hypertext links, "hyperlinks", within a single document and across several documents, and links to external applications, graphics, sounds, and animation.

It was in 1990 that Paul Allen and Dan Taggart, two graduates of BYU, created Infobases, Inc., and began offering LDS Church publications on computer floppy disks. They chose to use Folio Views as their infobase indexing and presentation technology, since Allen was familiar with it, having worked at Folio Corporation since that company's founding in 1987. Folio was co-founded by Paul Allen's brother Curt Allen, and by his brother-in-law Brad Pelo. Using Folio technology seemed a natural way to offer LDS publications as a business venture.

In March 1991, Folio released MailBag, an infobase application that stored and retrieved electronic mail messages on a Novell LAN.

Folio Views 2.1 was released in June 1991. Included was Folio Views Personal Edition, which allowed users to search, annotate, edit, group, link and output information on their personal computers. This was the company's first MS-DOS program.

The Electronic Labyrinth described Folio Views 2.1 as follows: "a document indexing and retrieval package for DOS text mode. In the terminology of this software nodes are folios and collections of folios are infobases. An infobase consists of the original text plus full text indexing. The total file size is about half that of the original text, due to some clever file compression. Folio refers to this as "underhead" technology. The searching facility is powerful, supporting Booleans, wildcards, and proximity criteria. Reference links may be made to other folios, external programs, PCX graphics, or audio files in RealSound format. Nodes may be grouped in clusters to facilitate organization and comparisons between groups. Text editing features include block operations and highlighting. Over forty file formats may be imported; 2GB of text may be stored in all. The interface is based on a window paradigm and supports a mouse. On-line help is available. Folio Views is priced at $695. A personal edition, which has full functionality but cannot create new infobases, is $295. The runtime module allows read-only access. An unlimited not-for-profit license is $1995." As of 2000, all Folio DOS programs had been retired.

Sale to Mead Data Central (LEXIS-NEXIS)

On December 31, 1992, Mead Data Central, Inc., provider of the LEXIS and NEXIS computer services, purchased Folio Corporation. Included in the description of the sale was that Folio software was being used by more than 80 commercial publishers in creating and distributing electronic versions of thousands of popular printed works, principally on compact disks and magnetic media. The market leader was Lotus Notes, and Mead Data Central, with annual revenues of $469.5 million, was well placed to compete. LEXIS-NEXIS was sold to Reed Elsevier Group in December 1994.

In May 1993, Folio Corporation released Folio Views 3.0.

When Folio Corporation announced a planned move to a new location in the RiverWoods Research and Business Park in north Provo, the company stated that it had 104 employees, twice the number of a year before. Product sales doubled with the release of Folio Views 3.0.

Folio's rapid rise was seen in an October 1995 news release about an expanded relationship between Folio Corporation and Novell, increasing the use of Folio products as part of Novell's NetWare Directory Services. Folio stated that its "infobase publishing platform is rapidly becoming a standard for professional and business content providers in industries such as legal, accounting, tax, medical, pharmaceutical, and insurance." Folio added that they had as their customer base, nearly 600 commercial publishers, and that they were "the world's leading provider of infobase software with its products installed on an estimated 30 million desktops."

In June 1996 Folio released Web Retriever 2.0, to import web content into infobase indexed documents. As its technology continued to improve, Folio's Web Retriever later became known Folio SiteDirector, then Folio LivePublish, then NextPage NXT.

In September 1996 Folio Corporation released Folio 4, replacing the latest version of Folio Bound Views, 3.11.2.

Folio Builder was for building the infobases at the core of Folio 4. Folio Builder indexed and compiled ASCII, Word, WordPerfect, FrameMaker, and Folio flat files into an infobase and provides a developer with encryption, compression, and security options. Folio Builder was previously called the Infobase Production Kit. The Folio product line included Folio SiteDirector, Folio Views, Folio Builder, Folio Publisher, Folio Integrator, Folio 4, LivePublish and SecurePublish.

Sale To Open Market
In March 1997, after less than five years as part of Mead Data Central and LexisNexis, including less than three years as part of Reed Elsevier Group, which had purchased LexisNexis in December 1994, Folio Corporation was sold to Open Market, an internet company based in Massachusetts. Open Market was seeking to take advantage of the growing electronic commerce phenomena taking place on the World Wide Web. Open Market intended to use Folio's technology to enter the electronic commerce market to sell products via the internet. Folio's business of creating and retrieving, and cross-linking multimedia databases "never seemed to gel" with its parent company's LexisNexis database.

Folio was sold to Open Market for $45 million. Two weeks before, Open Market had purchased WayPoint, a business solution designed to create Internet-based business-to-business catalogs by retrieving complex product information from databases. Cambridge, Massachusetts-based Open Market retained Folio's 190 employees at Folio's Provo, Utah, headquarters. Folio was to operate as a division of Open Market under Folio president Bill Bennett. Open Market would combine Folio's document management software with its own e-commerce transaction management package (OM-Transact) to provide new products for companies selling information-based services. The merger was to result in products that combined Open Market's server-based "back-end" transaction management and security technologies with Folio's server-based "front-end" information databases and search-retrieval software. Products featuring the combined technologies were expected by the end of June 1997.

Market reception
In an industry-wide review of network-based internal search engines, Network Computing magazine ranked Folio SiteDirector 3.1 number 8 of the 10 products it reviewed, saying, "Folio's siteDirector is a completely different approach to providing a searchable index of a Web site, quite unlike the other search engines we tested. In fact, SiteDirector assumes you've rendered the contents of your Web site as an infobase--Folio's term for its searchable, multilinked, compressed repository of text and graphics. SiteDirector serves up the infobase contents as HTML and lets you search the infobase." This was in the days before the emphasis on more recent World Wide Web standards, and this review made comment about the specialized HTML tags used by Folio. To test the software's function, the testers "used Folio's supplied HTML templates (called SoftPages) to create HTML pages laced with infobase-specific HTML tags, editing those pages with the customized version of the HomeSite HTML page authoring software that Folio bundles with SiteDirector. The special HTML tags let SiteDirector deliver specific infobase documents or elements when called for by the Web page."

"Infobase files store text, word processor documents, and multimedia data in a highly compressed format that includes a full index of the file's contents. The SiteDirector server instantly converts infobase files to HTML format when a browser requests a Web page. SiteDirector's search engine lets users search all the text in a multi-gigabyte infobase file in less than a second."

Newspapers were realizing that they had potential revenue in their archives. One of the users was the Salt Lake City Tribune, which used SiteDirector to sell access to their archives, stored in Folio's infobase file format.

(In July 1997, Allen and Taggart had purchased Western Standard's interest in Ancestry, Inc. (Ancestry.com). At the time, Brad Pelo was president and CEO of Infobases, and president of Western Standard. Less than six months earlier, he had been president of Folio Corporation, whose digital technology Infobases was using.)

In February 1998, Open Market announced that Folio would make use of the new standards XML for content, and XSL for style.

Folio had its roots in local area networks, "intranets", and CD-ROM publishing. Open Market found Folio's technology difficult to integrate into its own technology for ecommerce web sites and web content management. In a later bankruptcy court hearing, one of the statements showed that "Folio was more designed for multimedia distribution. It was not really focused on the Web. Making a conversion of that product over to the Web was actually going to be more costly than [initially thought]".

Folio 4.2 was released by Open Market in October 1998. At the same time, Open Market released LivePublish to replace the earlier Folio SiteDirector. (A SiteDirector license was priced at $4,995) SiteDirector was developed as a way for companies to publish information previously available only in LAN-based versions of Folio's software. Several companies that use Folio's products internally were adding SiteDirector to sell access to their private repositories on the Web.

In mid-1998, Open Market licensed Folio technology to ITM Products for that company's new Fusion technology to bridge between Lotus Notes databases to Folio infobases. (The Fusion product sold for about $15,000 for a 300-seat license.)

"Open Market's first quarter 1999 revenue of $12.6 million for its e-commerce products grew 116 percent over the same period of the previous year. Folio product sales tallied only $3 million for the same quarter."

Although still the number one seller of consumer e-commerce software, Open Market's share of its market fell from 31 percent in 1997, to 22 percent in 1998. It main competitor, BroadVision, was consistently gaining customers in the explosive $580 million e-commerce market. Open Market started out badly by focusing on large complex systems for large companies such as AT&T and Time Warner, building online shopping malls based on its $1 million software service contracts. The competition was focusing on smaller simple products aimed at individual businesses, and being able to respond to customer's rapid changing needs.

Open Market struggled to integrate the Folio technology into its business model, and together with a growing sense of reality among investors and businesses of high tech internet-related stocks, the company was soon seeing serious decline in its fortunes. A change in management at Open Market, and a switch in technologies in mid-1999 saw the Folio technology licensed back to Pelo and a group of Utah investors that included Alan Ashton of WordPerfect fame, under the name of ABSB.

Folio licensed to NextPage
In an agreement that took effect on July 1, 1999, Open Market ceased to sell Folio's products and instead licensed them to a new company known as NextPage; NextPage was led by Brad Pelo, a co-founder of the original Folio Corporation. From 1993 to 1995, Pelo was head of business development for LEXIS/NEXIS,  and from 1995 to 1999, he was president of publisher Bookcraft, Inc. Pelo left Bookcraft in 1999 when the company was purchased by Deseret Management Corporation, parent company of its competitor Deseret Book. Pelo formed NextPage along with three other private investors, including Alan Ashton, one of the founders of WordPerfect.

NextPage and Open Market completed an agreement giving NextPage exclusive rights to the future development, marketing, sales and support of Open Market's Folio product line. All of Open Market's Folio-related contracts, partnerships and licenses were transferred to NextPage. In addition, nearly all of Open Market's 90 Folio employees were retained to work in the new company that was to be headquartered in Provo, Utah.

Under the terms of the deal, NextPage, which was known as ABSB L.C. in the initial June 9, 1999 marketing agreement, would resell the Folio products exclusively for a three-year period. NextPage would also have non-exclusive rights to resell Open Market's non-Folio commerce products. Open Market was to receive guaranteed royalties of $14 million for the Folio products, and another $14 million in license fees for its commerce tools. The sale of Folio would allow Open Market to focus on its Internet commerce products, which were to combine order processing and secure payment collection. NextPage registered itself with the State of Utah as a private company on June 8, 1999. At the same time, NextPage registered the Folio.com name.

For two years, Open Market had hoped that adding Folio to its product line for electronic publishers would bring success as those publishers migrated from CD-ROMs to web-based applications on the Internet. The spin-off to NextPage (ABSB) cut 90 employees from Open Market's payroll, an additional 25 percent in addition to 20 percent cut just before Folio was spun off. Wall Street investors responded to the announcement by Open Market's stock closing up 5 percent. The spin off was for a license and guaranteed license fee, with a final sale to take place at the end of the three-year license period.

Open Market was quick to separate itself from Folio, and to distinguish its recent acquisition FutureTense. Where Folio was well-suited to delivering large collections of reference material, Open Market took a different course, using FutureTense technology which was better suited for the ecommerce business that Open Market had decided to focus on, rather than the document management technology that Folio was focused on. Open Market had purchased at least two other content management providers, and absorb their technologies, but was never able to fully recover. FutureTense failed to save Open Market as a company, and they declared bankruptcy in March (or August) 2003. In 2004 FutureTense, and associated Open Market technologies were part of FatWire Software Corporation, owners of UpdateEngine, a Java-based content management solution.

NextPage soon embarked on an expanding effort to leverage the benefits of Folio technology into what was variously called Peer-To-Peer Content Networking and eContent Platform. A description of Folio included its ability to index all sorts of documents on a company's internal network, known as an intranet, and make those documents readily available to all users on the network, either local or remote.

NextPage continued to improve on the Folio technology. Within less than two years, the technology was being successfully marketed as NextPage's NXT. In January 2000 NextPage purchased Texas-based Complete Data Systems, and in January 2001 NextPage announced that it would purchase netLens, Inc., of Cupertino, CA. Incorporating netLens' PeerSpace technology would allow NextPage to connect its networks with users' mobile devices.

By September 2000, NextPage was about to release NXT 3, the next generation of its Folio suite of products.

NextPage CEO Brad Pelo give testimony before a committee of the U.S. Senate in Provo, UT on October 9, 2000, on the advantages of NextPage's Folio server-based peer-to-peer document management, in a hearing about the future of the Internet, and on the negative impact of Napster, a similar peer-to-peer technology that allowed users to share music across the internet. Also at the hearing was Shawn Fanning, creator of the Napster peer-to-peer network.

NextPage, Inc. moved into its new headquarters at Thanksgiving Point in October 2000. An inauguration ceremony was held on October 16, 2000, attended by 300 guests, including Pelo, Ashton, and Utah Governor Mike Leavitt. At the same time, the company released its NXT 3 product line. NextPage technology was promoted as eliminating traditional barriers of both internal and external networks by providing users single point access to information that may be located on several different local servers or remote servers located in other countries. Their promotional literature stated that once these sources were linked together in a secure "Peer-to-Peer Content Network," they became a single, virtual repository.

Folio products would not be upgraded or improved, just supported with bug fixes (as of mid-2008, they were up to Folio 4.7). All development activities would be pointed to NextPage LivePublish, now known as NextPage NXT, which indexed Word, HTML, XML, PowerPoint, Excel, PDF, and Folio 4.x infobase formatted documents. The next release of LivePublish was in its 6.0 version, but with a new name: NextPage LivePublish 2.0. With its upcoming release, Folio LivePublish 5.0 was informally renamed as NextPage LivePublish 1.0, and in September 2000, NextPage LivePublish 2.0 was replaced by LivePublish 3.0, but renamed to NextPage NXT 3, using the same technology. (At its launch in January 2001, NXT 3 was priced at $85,000 for 250 users.)

Sale to NextPage

Folio was sold to NextPage on March 23, 2001, for the stated amount of $6.6 million. Open Market had licensed, with an option to purchase, the Folio technology to NextPage in July 1999. Included in the March 2001 sale was the building and facilities, which NextPage had only leased from Open Market after the initial deal in 1999.

In October 2001, NextPage released an upgrade to the NXT suite of products that allowed peer-to-peer collaboration over a customer's secure network. The price of the package for 250 users was stated as being $85,000. Another upgrade in April 2002, called NextPage Solo, allowed customers all of the advantages of their secure peer-to-peer secure network, by way local desktop computers or compact disks, for times that a user is not connected to a network.

In April 2003, NextPage moved its headquarters from Lehi to Draper, Utah.

Sale to FAST

On September 1, 2004, NextPage, announced that Fast Search & Transfer (FAST), a Norwegian-based developer of enterprise search and real-time alerting technologies, had agreed to purchase the technology, product lines, and the over 500 customers and partners of NextPage's publishing applications business unit, including NXT, Folio, LivePublish, and GetSmart. NextPage's document management services, known as Project Chrome, was to remain with the company.

NextPage received $6 million in cash, and was eligible to receive performance-based payments up to a maximum of $9 million over four years.

FAST had been a VAR of Folio products since 1991.

In January 2006, FAST announced the release of ProPublish 4.1. The relationship of the old Folio format to this newer ProPublish format is not known, but the news release showed that ProPublish included "Enhanced support for Folio and NXT content types."

In 2007 FAST released Folio Views, Folio Builder, Folio Publisher, and Folio Integrator 4.7.1 shortly before Microsoft acquired FAST.

Sale to Microsoft 

On April 25, 2008, Microsoft completed its acquisition of FAST.

Sale to Rocket Software 

On December 2, 2009, Rocket Software, based in Newton, Massachusetts, acquired Folio and NXT from Microsoft.
Rocket Software is a software development firm that builds and services Enterprise Infrastructure products in the areas of database, business intelligence, storage, networks and telecom, terminal emulation and FTP, integration, modernization and SOA, and security.

On February 10, 2010, Rocket Software released Folio Views, Folio Builder, Folio Publisher, and Folio Integrator version 4.7.2, the first release of Folio to officially support Windows Vista and Windows 7 32/64-bit.

Folio versions

References 

Content management systems
Software companies based in Utah
Companies based in Utah
Software companies established in 1987
1987 establishments in Utah
Defunct software companies of the United States